Brownsville is an unincorporated community in Fulton County, Kentucky, United States.

References

Unincorporated communities in Fulton County, Kentucky
Unincorporated communities in Kentucky